TISM were an alternative rock band from Melbourne, Australia.

TISM may also refer to:

 This Is Serious Mum, a 1984 demo tape
 The Incredible Shrinking Man, a 1957 science fiction film
 Tulane Institute of Sports Medicine, part of Tulane University School of Science and Engineering
 Telecom Italia San Marino, a San Marino telecommunications company owned by Telecom Italia

See also
 TIMS (disambiguation)
 TSM (disambiguation)
 TMS (disambiguation)